Book is an unincorporated community in Catahoula Parish, Louisiana, United States.

History
Book was named for a family of pioneer settlers which included the first postmaster.

References

Unincorporated communities in Catahoula Parish, Louisiana
Unincorporated communities in Louisiana